"Whip It!" is a single by American rapper LunchMoney Lewis featuring Chloe Angelides. It was released on August 7, 2015. The song contains samples from the 1980s song, "Let It Whip" by the Dazz Band.

Background
The song samples Dazz Band's "Let It Whip". Space Primates brought the initial track idea with the sample flip to Dr. Luke who then sent it to Lunchmoney. Lunchmoney discussed the song's conception: "The ‘let it whip, child’… [...] It was a real uptempo disco song. When I heard the sample, it really drove me to it and I was thinking, ‘this is funky… I like it’. And I wrote some verses, played it to Dr. Luke and he really liked it. Then we got in Chloe Angelides; she’s an awesome songwriter with a crazy voice."

Music video
On August 19, 2015, the lyric video premiered on YouTube. The video features a bunch of women walking and skating around the city and the beach. Two other videos were posted to YouTube; an audio video, and an official music video. As of May 2017, the three videos have a combined 9 million views on YouTube.

On September 15, the music video premiered. It features LunchMoney in a suit performing the song on a 1970s variety show, with Angelides singing behind him and dancers on the stage.

Charts

Weekly charts

Year-end charts

Certifications

References

2015 songs
2015 singles
LunchMoney Lewis songs
Songs written by Cirkut (record producer)
Songs written by Dr. Luke
Columbia Records singles
Songs written by Chloe Angelides
Songs written by LunchMoney Lewis